Frederick Meares Osborne  & Bar, VRD (20 January 1909 – 23 July 1996) was an Australian politician and government minister.

Osborne was born in Orange, New South Wales, and educated at North Sydney High School and Sydney Church of England Grammar School. He graduated with a degree in law from the University of Sydney. He joined the Royal Australian Naval Volunteer Reserve in 1938, and with the outbreak of the Second World War, he was seconded to the Royal Navy in 1940. He was awarded a Distinguished Service Cross in 1940 for "bravery and devotion to duty" while assisting the evacuation of forces from Norway as a sub-lieutenant on the St Loman, an armed trawler. He crossed the Atlantic 22 times and was the only Royal Australian Naval Volunteer Reserve officer to rise to the command of a Royal Navy destroyer during the war. In 1945 a Bar was added to his DSC for sinking of a German U-boat.

Political career
Osborne was elected as the member for Evans at the December 1949 election as a Liberal.  He was Minister for Customs and Excise from January to October 1956, Minister for Air from October 1956 to December 1960 and Minister for Repatriation from December 1960 to his defeat at the December 1961 election. 

Osborne, as Minister for Air, and Keith Brennan from the Department of External Affairs, represented the Australian Government in the independence celebrations for Ghana from 2–10 March 1957.

Following his defeat he returned to his legal practice, but continued to play a major role in the New South Wales branch of the Liberal Party and was its president from 1967 to 1970.  He supported a change in Liberal Party policy in favour of support for state aid for independent schools, a policy adopted by the three major national political parties by the 1972 election. He was invested as a Companion of the Order of St Michael and St George for distinguished services to government and the community.

Osborne was survived by his wife, Elizabeth and four children, Alick, Michael, Imogen and Penelope.

Notes

1909 births
1996 deaths
Australian Companions of the Order of St Michael and St George
Australian recipients of the Distinguished Service Cross (United Kingdom)
Liberal Party of Australia members of the Parliament of Australia
Members of the Australian House of Representatives for Evans
People educated at North Sydney Boys High School
Royal Australian Navy officers
Royal Australian Navy personnel of World War II
20th-century Australian politicians
People from Orange, New South Wales
Royal Navy officers of World War II